Ganquan County is a county in the north of Shaanxi province, China. It is under the administration of the prefecture-level city of Yan'an.

Administrative divisions
The county is divided into 1 subdistrict, 3 towns, and 2 townships. The county's administrative offices are located in its sole subdistrict, .

Geography 
The county is located in the hilly Loess Plateau in Northern Shaanxi.

Climate 

Economy 
In 2013, Ganquan County reported a GDP of 2.13 billion Renminbi, which had fallen 2.058 billion by 2016 due to decreased oil production. Despite this, the county's residents experienced an increase in average annual disposable income during this time, with urban residents' income rising from 25,835 Renminbi to 29,419, and agrarian residents' income rising from 8,642 Renminbi to 10,462.

Agriculture 
The county has a sizable agriculture sector, producing 40,000 tons of grain and 122,000 tons of vegetables as of 2013. The county government reported 125,000 lives pigs and 2.25 million live heads of poultry in the county the same year. Some of the county's food products have gained recognition throughout China, namely Ganquan dried tofu, Meishui wine, Fangxin cabbage, and Laoshan eggs.

Natural Resources 
Ganquan County is home to a number of natural resources, such as coal, petroleum, natural gas, limestone, gold, silver, copper, and iron. In 2013, the county produced 365,000 tons of oil, adding 779 million Renminbi to the economy, which accounted for 36.58% of Ganquan's GDP. The county's petroleum reserves total 110.678 billion tons, and the county's natural gas reserves total 20 billion cubic meters.

Transportation

Roadways 

China National Highway 210
G65 Baomao Expressway

Railways 

Xi'an–Yan'an Railway
Baotou–Xi'an railway

References

External links

County-level divisions of Shaanxi
Yan'an